The Valentin's Classification of Coastal Contexts recognises that coasts can be erosional or depositional and emerging or submerging and that these effects can magnify or neutralise each other.  It was devised by Valentin in 1952.

References 

Coastal geography